Some areas of An Garda Síochána have been split into modified divisions and districts since the pilot of the new Garda Operating Model came into effect on Monday, 7 October 2019. The rollout started with Galway, Cork City, Dublin South Central, Meath/Westmeath and Limerick and has continued since March 2020. In the Dublin Metropolitan Region (DMR) each district is assigned a unique letter which are listed in the table below. Outside of the DMR, letters are assigned by division.

Dublin

References

Garda Districts
Districts
Garda